Patrick Wayne Miller (born January 15, 1980) is a United States Army soldier. He was a private first class during the 2003 invasion of Iraq with the U.S. Army's 507th Maintenance Company, serving as a mechanic, becoming a POW.  For his actions leading up to his capture, he was awarded the Silver Star for valor.  He retired from the United States Army in August 2022.

Early life and education
Miller is a 1998 graduate of Valley Center High School in Valley Center, Kansas a town of 5,000 people outside Wichita, Kansas. Employed in civilian life as a welder, he joined the U.S. Army in the summer of 2002, to help pay for his student loans.

Career

2003: 507th ambush
On March 23, 2003, Iraqi forces ambushed the trail convoy element of the 507th Maintenance Company that had taken a wrong turn near An Nasiriyah. There had been bitter fighting around Nasiriyah, a vital crossing point of the River Euphrates. Miller was driving the last truck in the convoy with Private First Class Brandon Sloan and Sergeant James Riley as passengers. During the attack, he floored the accelerator, trying to steer and duck bullets at the same time. Enemy fire killed Sloan and damaged his truck's transmission, disabling the vehicle.

Silver Star and other awards
Prior to his capture, Miller had stood his ground firing at the Iraqis with a malfunctioning weapon, feeding bullets into it by hand to protect two wounded comrades. A U.S. Army press release said Miller jumped from his vehicle and began firing on a mortar position that he believed was about to open fire on his convoy.

Miller was held for 22 days with four other members of his unit including:

 Spc. Edgar Hernandez - Mission, Texas.
 Spc. Joseph Hudson - Alamogordo, New Mexico.
 Spc. Shoshana Johnson - El Paso, Texas.
 Sgt. James Riley - Pennsauken, New Jersey,
 Pvt. Jessica Lynch - Palestine, West Virginia. Part of same unit but held separately in a different location

After he was captured, he was repeatedly questioned about radio frequencies that were written on pieces of paper inside his helmet. "Thinking on his feet, Pfc. Miller told his captors that they were prices for power steering pumps," the release said. "Disgusted, the captors threw the frequencies and his helmet into the fire."

For these actions he was awarded the Silver Star the third-highest military award for heroism in combat.  Along with the Silver Star, Patrick Miller also received a Purple Heart and Prisoner of War Medal on July 2, 2003, during an Independence Day celebration at Fort Bliss, Texas.

On 20 July 2005, while serving with the 183rd Maintenance Company, Fort Carson, Miller was awarded the Combat Action Badge by retired Command Sergeant Major Tyler Walker.

The U.S. Army Materiel Command (AMC) at Fort Belvoir, Virginia named its operations center and dedicated a wall in Miller's honor in January 2004. Miller attended the ceremony with his mother and his wife and their two small children.

Silver Star citation
"The President of the United States takes pleasure in presenting the Silver Star Medal to Patrick Miller, Private First Class, U.S. Army, for conspicuous gallantry and intrepidity in action while serving as a Mechanic with the 507th Maintenance Company, 11th Air Defense Artillery Brigade, during combat operations in support of Operation IRAQI FREEDOM, near An Nasiriya, Iraq, on 23 March 2003. On that date a huge American convoy headed from Kuwait to Baghdad. A dozen heavy trucks and other maintenance vehicles fell behind the rest and got lost. At sunrise, Iraqi troops ambushed the lost soldiers, firing from both sides of the highway. The Americans sped up to escape the attack, but one Humvee smashed into the back of a jack-knifed American tractor-trailer. Less than a mile behind that accident, Private Miller was driving the last truck in the convoy. During the attack, he floored the accelerator, trying to steer and duck bullets at the same time. During the ensuing battle he single-handedly stopped a mortar attack aimed at trapped soldiers."

Miller as a POW
He was one of five POWs to be interviewed on Al Jazeera. In the interview, he was asked why he came to Iraq, his reply was "I come to fix broke stuff." Asked if he came to shoot Iraqis, he answered, "No, I come to shoot only if I am shot at. They don't bother me, I don't bother them."

Miller lost 25 pounds in three weeks as a prisoner of war, eating boiled chicken, rice and bread so hard he had to throw it against the wall to be able to chew it.

After Iraq
After returning to Fort Bliss, Texas, Miller stayed on active duty with the U.S. Army and was transferred to Fort Carson, Colorado (2003-2008), Fort Riley, Kansas (2008-2012), Fort Drum, New York (2012-2015), He deployed to Afghanistan as part of Operation Enduring Freedom in 2013 with HHC, 210th Brigade Support Battalion, 2nd Infantry Brigade Combat Team, 10th Mountain Division, (Jan 2013 - Sep 2013), Republic of Korea (2015-2016), Fort Riley, Kansas (2016-2022). He retired from active duty as a Sergeant First Class as of August 2022.

References

Further reading
Hegeman, Roxana, "'Please Do Something for My Son' - Families Identify Soldiers Held Captive in Iraq". The Associated Press, March 24, 2003.

Living people
Logistics personnel of the United States military
United States Army soldiers
Iraq War prisoners of war
Recipients of the Silver Star
American prisoners of war
1980 births
Prisoners of war held by Iraq
United States Army personnel of the Iraq War